In evolutionary biology, the GARD (Graded Autocatalysis Replication Domain) model is a general kinetic model for homeostatic-growth and fission of compositional-assemblies, with specific application towards lipids.

In the context of abiogenesis, the lipid-world suggests assemblies of simple molecules, such as lipids, can store and propagate information, thus undergo evolution.

These 'compositional assemblies' have been suggested to play a role in the origin of life. The idea is the information being transferred throughout the generations is  compositional information  – the different types and quantities of molecules within an assembly. This is different from the information encoded in RNA or DNA, which is the specific sequence of bases in such molecule. Thus, the model is viewed as an alternative or an ancestor to the RNA world hypothesis.

The model

The composition vector of an assembly is written as: . Where  are the molecular counts of lipid type i within the assembly, and NG is how many different lipid types exist (repertoire size).

The change in the count of molecule type i is described by:

 

The system is kept away from equilibrium by imposing a fission action once the assembly reaches a maximal size, Nmax, usually in the order of NG. This splitting action produces two progeny of same size, and one of which is grown again.

The model is subjected to a Monte Carlo algorithm based simulations, using Gillespie algorithm.

Selection
In 2010, Eors Szathmary and collaborators have chosen GARD as an archetypal metabolism-first realization. They have introduced selection coefficient into the model, which increase or decrease the growth rate of assemblies, depending on how similar or dis-similar they are to a given target. They found that the ranking of the assemblies are un-affected by the selection pressure, and concluded that GARD does not exhibit Darwinian evolution.

In 2012 it was shown that this criticism is erroneous and was refuted. Two major drawbacks of the 2010 paper were: (1) they have focused on a general assembly and not on a composome or compotype (faithfully replicating and quasispecies, respectively); (2) they have performed only a single, random, simulation to test the selectability.

Quasispecies
The quasispecies model describes a population of replicators that replicate with relatively high mutations. Due to mutations and back mutations the population eventually centres around a master-replicator (master sequence). GARD's populations were shown to form a quasispecies around a master-compotype and to exhibit an error catastrophe, similarly to classical quasispecies such as RNA viruses.

See also
Abiogenesis
Protocell

References

External links
GARD10 MATLAB code (see Markovitch and Lancet, 2012): https://github.com/ModelingOriginsofLife/GARD
Doron Lancet homepage at Weizmann Institute of Science, who is the inventor of GARD.
Origin of life (OOL ) at the Weizmann Institute.

Evolutionary biology
Origin of life
Stochastic simulation